Marrithiyel (Marithiel, also Maridhiel, Maridhiyel), also known as Berringen (Bringen, Brinken), is an Australian Aboriginal language spoken by the Marrithiyal people.

Dialects besides Marrithiyel proper are Nganygit, Marri Amu (Marriammu, Mare-Ammu), Maridjabin (Maredyerbin, Maretyabin, Maridyerbin, Maritjabin), Marridan (Meradan), Marramanindjdji (Marramaninydyi, Marimanindji), and Mariyedi.

The Marri Amu dialect is part of a language revival project to save critically endangered languages. 
, Marri Amu is one of 20 languages prioritised as part of the Priority Languages Support Project, being undertaken by First Languages Australia and funded by the Department of Communications and the Arts. The project aims to "identify and document critically-endangered languages — those languages for which little or no documentation exists, where no recordings have previously been made, but where there are living speakers".

Sounds

Consonants 

 Retroflex sounds /ɳ ɭ/ may have also been recorded.
Alveolar sound /t/ may also be heard as [ʈ].
A dental fricative /θ/ can also be heard as a stop [t̪].

Vowels 

 An additional central vowel [ɜ] is also heard among dialects.
/i u/ can also be heard as [ɪ ʊ].
/u/ may also have an allophone of [ɔ].
/a/ can have front and central allophones of [a ɒ].

References

External links
 Marrithiyel at the Dalylanguages.org website.
 Marri Tjevin (dialect of Marrithiyel) at the Dalylanguages.org website.
 Marri Ammu (dialect of Marrithiyel) at the Dalylanguages.org website.
 Marri Dan (dialect of Marrithiyel) at the Dalylanguages.org website.
 Marramaninjsji (closely related to Marrithiyel) at the Dalylanguages.org website.

Western Daly languages
Endangered indigenous Australian languages in the Northern Territory